Yemin may refer to (not to be confused with the country of Yemen):
 Yemin
 Yemin Moshe
 Dan Yemin, a Jewish musician and vocalist

Turkish words and phrases
Jewish surnames